Jackson Cates (born September 28, 1997) is an American professional ice hockey center for the Lehigh Valley Phantoms of the American Hockey League (AHL) as a prospect to the Philadelphia Flyers of the National Hockey League (NHL).

Early life 
Cates was born on September 28, 1997 in Stillwater, Minnesota. He played ice hockey for the Stillwater Area High School Ponies, a tenure which included two state tournament appearances in 2014 and 2016. His career totals of 57 goals and 63 assists, for a total of 120 points, was the highest in school history, and at the end of his senior year, Cates was given the Herb Brooks Award, bestowed annually on the state tournament player who best demonstrates the values and traits exemplified by Herb Brooks.

Playing career

Amateur 
Cates played junior ice hockey with the Waterloo Black Hawks of the United States Hockey League. He scored a hat trick with the team on January 28, 2018 in a 7–3 rout of the Cedar Rapids RoughRiders.

Cates originally committed to play hockey at Michigan Tech, but decided to sign a National Letter of Intent with the University of Minnesota Duluth in August 2017 so that he could play alongside his younger brother. In his junior season, Cates posted 27 points (11 goals and 16 assists) in 28 games with the Bulldogs.

Professional 
On April 13, 2021, the Philadelphia Flyers of the National Hockey League (NHL) signed Cates as a college free agent to a two-year entry-level contract with an average annual value of $925,000. Due to COVID-19 restrictions, Cates was required to quarantine after arriving in Philadelphia before he could skate with the team. Cates made his NHL debut on April 23, 2021, in a game against the New York Rangers.

When Morgan Frost was placed in COVID-19 protocols on December 15, 2021, Cates was promoted to Philadelphia for their road game against the Montreal Canadiens. He scored his first NHL goal in that game, putting the Flyers up 2–1 in a shootout loss.

Player profile 
Scott Sandelin, Cates' coach at Minnesota Duluth, referred to him as "a really smart skater who can make plays", and emphasized Cates' 200-foot game, power play, and penalty kill abilities.

Personal life 
Cates is the older brother of Noah Cates, who was selected by the Flyers in the fifth round of the 2017 NHL Entry Draft.

Career statistics

References

External links
 

1997 births
Living people
American men's ice hockey centers
Lehigh Valley Phantoms players
Minnesota Duluth Bulldogs men's ice hockey players
Ice hockey players from Minnesota
People from Stillwater, Minnesota
Waterloo Black Hawks players
Philadelphia Flyers players
Undrafted National Hockey League players